The Bourgeois Lake is a freshwater body located in the north central part of the Gouin Reservoir, in the territory of the town of La Tuque, in the administrative region of the Mauricie, in the province of Quebec, in Canada.

This lake extends in the cantons of Lemay (southern part of the lake) and Toussaint (in the North).

Recreotourism activities are the main economic activity of the sector. Forestry comes second. Recreational boating is particularly popular on this water, especially for sport fishing.

The Lake Bourgeois hydrographic slope is served on the north side by secondary forest roads connected to the R2046 and R1045 forest roads that connect the village of Obedjiwan, Quebec.

The surface of Lake Bourgeois is usually frozen from mid-November to the end of April, however, safe ice circulation is generally from early December to the end of March. Water management at the Gouin Dam can lead to significant variations in the water level, particularly at the end of the winter when the water is lowered.

Geography

Toponymy
The term "Bourgeois" is a family name of French origin.

The toponym "Lac Bourgeois" was formalized on December 18, 1986, by the Commission de toponymie du Québec
.

Notes and references

See also 

Lakes of Mauricie
La Tuque, Quebec